Jabour may refer to:
Jabour (region), a region of Rio de Janeiro
Jabour (surname)